In chemistry, molecules with a non-collinear arrangement of two adjacent bonds have bent molecular geometry, also known as angular or V-shaped. Certain atoms, such as oxygen, will almost always set their two (or more) covalent bonds in non-collinear directions due to their electron configuration. Water (H2O) is an example of a bent molecule, as well as its analogues.  The bond angle between the two hydrogen atoms is approximately 104.45°. Nonlinear geometry is commonly observed for other triatomic molecules and ions containing only main group elements, prominent examples being nitrogen dioxide (NO2), sulfur dichloride (SCl2), and methylene (CH2).

This geometry is almost always consistent with VSEPR theory, which usually explains non-collinearity of atoms with a presence of lone pairs. There are several variants of bending, where the most common is AX2E2 where two covalent bonds and two lone pairs of the central atom (A) form a complete 8-electron shell. They have central angles from 104° to 109.5°, where the latter is consistent with a simplistic theory which predicts the tetrahedral symmetry of four sp3 hybridised orbitals. The most common actual angles are 105°, 107°, and 109°: they vary because of the different properties of the peripheral atoms (X).

Other cases also experience orbital hybridisation, but in different degrees. AX2E1 molecules, such as SnCl2, have only one lone pair and the central angle about 120° (the centre and two vertices of an equilateral triangle). They have three sp2 orbitals. There exist also sd-hybridised AX2 compounds of transition metals without lone pairs: they have the central angle about 90° and are also classified as bent. (See further discussion at VSEPR theory#Complexes with strong d-contribution).

See also
AXE method

References

External links 
3D Chem: Chemistry, Structures, and 3D Molecules 
Indiana University Molecular Structure Center
 Interactive molecular examples for point groups
 Molecular Modeling
Animated Trigonal Planar Visual

Stereochemistry
Molecular geometry